Maria Viktorovna Koroleva (born October 16, 1974 in Chelyabinsk) is a Russian water polo player, who was part of the Bronze Medal winning team at the 2000 Summer Olympics in Sydney, Australia.

See also
 List of Olympic medalists in water polo (women)

External links
 

1974 births
Living people
Russian female water polo players
Olympic water polo players of Russia
Water polo players at the 2000 Summer Olympics
Olympic bronze medalists for Russia
Olympic medalists in water polo
Medalists at the 2000 Summer Olympics